Miskolci Atléta Kör or Miskolci Attila Futball Club was a Hungarian football club from the town of Miskolc.

History
Miskolci AK debuted in the 1931–32 season of the Hungarian League and finished eighth.

Name Changes
1926: Miskolci Atléta Kör
1926–1936: Miskolci Attila Kör/Attila FC
1936: dissolved
1936–1939: Miskolci Attila FC
1939–1940: Miskolci LESOK

Honours
Hungarian Cup:
 Runner-up (1) :1927–28

External links
 Profil

References

Football clubs in Hungary
Defunct football clubs in Hungary
1926 establishments in Hungary